Nieve King (née Jennings; born 3 August 1987) is a Scottish model and beauty queen who was crowned Miss Scotland 2007 and Miss United Kingdom 2007 and has also competed in the Miss World 2007 and Miss International 2008 pageants.

Miss Scotland 2007
At the age of 19, Nieve took part in the Miss Scotland 2007 contest when the event was held in Princes Square, Glasgow. She won the national crown, and other than winning the cash prize of £10,000 and a modelling contract, she also gained the right to represent her country at the Miss World 2007 pageant.

Miss World 2007
Nieve competed as Miss Scotland in the Miss World 2007 pageant when it was held in Sanya, China on 1 December 2007. She had her successes prior to the final competition when she was placed as 1st runner-up in two fast-track events, specifically Miss World Sports and Miss World Talent. Since she did not win any fast-track event, King was not granted automatic advancement to the semi-final. On the final night, King was placed as 16th place overall,

Miss United Kingdom 2007
As the highest placed delegate amongst the four United Kingdom contestants in Miss World 2007, King was awarded the title of Miss United Kingdom 2007 and won the right to represent the United Kingdom at the Miss International 2008 which was to be held the following year.

Miss International 2008
King competed at the 48th Miss International contest when it was held in Macau, China on 8 November 2008.

Personal life
King was born in Rottenrow, Glasgow, and grew up in Bishopbriggs, East Dunbartonshire. 
She married Stuart King in November 2015 in Loch Lomond after nine months of dating. On 6 August 2017, King and her husband welcomed their first born son.

References

Scottish female models
Miss World 2007 delegates
1987 births
Living people
People from Bishopbriggs
Miss International 2008 delegates
People educated at Turnbull High School
Scottish beauty pageant winners